L. V. Azariah B.D. (Serampore), Th. M. (WTS) was the second Bishop in Rayalaseema of the Church of South India.

Further reading
 
Notes

 

Anglican bishops of Rayalaseema
20th-century Anglican bishops in India
Senate of Serampore College (University) alumni
Church of South India clergy
Indian bishops
Indian Christian religious leaders
Western Theological Seminary alumni